Sons and Daughters ran for a total of 972 episodes. The show still airs as reruns on Australia's Channel 7Two.

Overview

Lists of soap opera episodes
Lists of Australian drama television series episodes